Alejandro Prospero Reverend (November 14, 1796 –December 1, 1881) was a French surgeon, doctor of Simon Bolivar from the arrival of the Venezuelan military and political leader to Santa Marta the night of December 1st of 1830 until his untimely death on 17 December 1830.

References

1796 births
1881 deaths
19th-century Venezuelan physicians
19th-century French physicians
Colombian physicians